Överkalix Municipality is a municipality in Norrbotten County in northern Sweden. Its seat is located in Överkalix.

In 1870 a part of old Överkalix Municipality was detached from it, forming a municipality called Korpilombolo (now in Pajala Municipality). The municipality was not affected by the two subdivision reforms of the 20th century.

The coat of arms was designed in 1944 and based on the arms of the parish. Its exact meaning is not known, but many northern arms feature bears, reindeer or other animals.

Geography
Överkalix Municipality is situated along the south-going Kalix River. The unmodified scenic nature along the river attracts tourists and fishers every year. Within the municipality one also finds two of the river's most powerful waterfalls, Jockfall (9 metres fall) and Linafall (16 metres fall).

Continuing north along the Kalix River one finds the iron ore mines. Travelling south towards the coast one finds larger towns, with Luleå being the closest, located some 100 kilometres south. Transportation is reliable thanks to the E10 highway.

The area otherwise contains much coniferous forests.

Localities
There are four localities (or urban areas) in Överkalix Municipality:

The municipal seat in bold

Language

The local Swedish dialect is known as överkalixmål, the Överkalix dialect. It is not mutually intelligible with Standard Swedish.

Economy
The municipality itself is the largest employer with around 430 employees. Thereafter follows Isolamin AB, a company making wall, ceiling and floor elements, with 110 employees. Other sectors:

Service companies, 150 employees
Forest and land companies, 45 employees
Truck and bus companies, 35 employees
Manufacturing companies, 20 employees

Traditionally the industry was dominated by forest industries, but this has decreased since the 1960s. It is estimated that the service sector will continue to expand and be the dominating sector some day. Many of those companies are in the field of computers and telecommunication.

Elections

Riksdag
These are the results of the elections to the Riksdag since the 1972 municipal reform. Norrbotten Party also contested the 1994 election but due to the party's small size at a nationwide level SCB did not publish the party's results at a municipal level. The same applies to the Sweden Democrats between 1988 and 1998. "Turnout" denotes the percentage of eligible voters casting any ballots, whereas "Votes" denotes the number of actual valid ballots cast.

Blocs

This lists the relative strength of the socialist and centre-right blocs since 1973, but parties not elected to the Riksdag are inserted as "other", including the Sweden Democrats results from 1988 to 2006, but also the Christian Democrats pre-1991 and the Greens in 1982, 1985 and 1991. The sources are identical to the table above. The coalition or government mandate marked in bold formed the government after the election. New Democracy got elected in 1991 but are still listed as "other" due to the short lifespan of the party.

References

External links

Överkalix Municipality - Official site

Municipalities of Norrbotten County